The 1973 Nippon Professional Baseball season was the 24th season of operation of Nippon Professional Baseball (NPB).

Regular season standings

Pacific League Playoff
The Pacific League teams with the best first and second-half records met in a best-of-five playoff series to determine the league representative in the Japan Series.

Nankai Hawks won the series 3-2.

Japan Series

Yomiuri Giants won the series 4-1.

References